Ben Coleman (born 13 April 1991 in Chelmsford) is a professional squash player who represents England. He reached a career-high world ranking of World No. 45 in May 2018.

References

External links 
 
 
 

English male squash players
Living people
1991 births